Pranab Bardhan (born 11 September 1939 in Calcutta) is an Indian economist who has taught and worked in the United States since 1979. He is Professor Emeritus of Economics at the University of California, Berkeley.

Biography
Bardhan received his bachelor's degree at Presidency College, Kolkata in 1958, his master's at University of Calcutta in 1960, and his doctorate at Cambridge University in 1966 with a dissertation entitled Economic Growth and the Pattern of International Trade and Investment: A Study in Pure Theory. He taught at the University of Calcutta (1961–62), MIT (1966–69), Indian Statistical Institute (1969–72), the Delhi School of Economics of the University of Delhi (1973–77) and joined the Berkeley economics department in 1977. He has been Visiting Professor/ Fellow at London School of Economics, Trinity College, Cambridge, St Catherine's College, Oxford, and University of Siena, Italy.

His early work was on growth and trade theory. Subsequently, he has done theoretical and empirical research on rural institutions in poor countries, on political economy of development policies, and on international trade and globalisation. A part of his work is in the interdisciplinary area of economics, political science, and social anthropology.

He has been on the editorial board of a number of economics journals, including The American Economic Review (1978–81), the Journal of Economic Perspectives (1989–94), the International Economic Review (associate editor, 1971–1985), and the Journal of Development Economics (chief editor, 1985 to 2003).

He won a Guggenheim Fellowship in 1981 and the Mohalanobis Gold Medal of the Indian Econometric Society in 1980.

He is the author of 13 books, more than 150 journal articles, and the editor of 12 other books. His memoirs in Bengali have been serialised in the Calcutta literary magazine Desh.

Bardhan is also on the advisory board of FFIPP-USA (Faculty for Israeli-Palestinian Peace-USA), a network of Palestinian, Israeli, and International faculty, and students, working in for an end of the Israeli occupation of Palestinian territories and just peace. He also served on the inaugural Social Sciences jury for the Infosys Prize in 2009.

Views 
For Bardhan, equality of opportunity is more important than equality of income. Equality of opportunity depends on such factors as land distribution, education, and social equality. In his book The Political Economy of Development in India, Bardhan discusses the nature of dominant proprietary classes in India'. He claims that the industrial capitalist class, rich farmers, and the professionals in the public sector are the three main dominant classes in India which play a major role in influencing and designing public policy. Bardhan claims that there is a conflict of interests among these classes and they fight and bargain to get adequate share in the spoils of the system. This process of negotiation and bargain gives relative autonomy to the Indian state to exert its power.

Selected works

Books 
 
 
 
 
 
 
 
 
 
 
 
 
 
  (A memoir.)
In Bengali as:

Chapters in books

References

External links
 About FFIPP

1939 births
Living people
People from Kolkata
Presidency University, Kolkata alumni
University of Calcutta alumni
Alumni of the University of Cambridge
University of California, Berkeley College of Letters and Science faculty
Academic staff of Delhi University
Indian development economists
20th-century Indian economists
Indian emigrants to the United States
American people of Indian descent